The 1905 Colorado Silver and Gold football team was an American football team that represented the University of Colorado as an independent during the 1905 college football season. Led by Willis Kienholz, in his first and only season as head coach, Colorado compiled a record of 8–1. The team left the Colorado Football Association (CFA), only to return the following season.

Schedule

References

Colorado
Colorado Buffaloes football seasons
Colorado Silver and Gold football